The Logistic Support Department of the Central Military Commission is a department under the Central Military Commission of the People's Republic of China. It was founded on January 11, 2016, under Xi Jinping's military reforms. The department organize and lead the logistics construction as well as overseeing housing, supplies, hospitals, and barracks of the People's Liberation Army. Its first director was Gen. Zhao Keshi. The current director is Lt. Gen. Zhang Lin.

References

See also 

 Central Military Commission (China)
 CMC Joint Logistics Support Force
 People's Liberation Army General Logistics Department (abolished)

Central Military Commission (China)
Military logistics units and formations of China
People's Liberation Army General Logistics Department
Government agencies established in 2016
2016 establishments in China